Shuna Matsumoto(松本 珠奈, Matsumoto Shuna, born July 27, 1985) is a Japanese association football coach of YSCC Yokohama. She is a trans woman.

References 

Living people
1985 births
21st-century Japanese women
Transgender sportswomen
Sports coaches
21st-century LGBT people
Japanese LGBT sportspeople